Bel Air Armory is a historic National Guard armory located at Bel Air, Harford County, Maryland.  It was constructed in 1915 of Port Deposit granite. The building consists of the main block, five bays by three, two stories over a raised basement, and the "drill hall" to the rear of the main block. The front elevation is detailed to recall Medieval fortifications and features two projecting hexagonal towers which rise to three stories and are topped by crenelated battlements finished in stone coping.

It was listed on the National Register of Historic Places in 1985.

References

External links
, including photo from 1980, at Maryland Historical Trust

Armories on the National Register of Historic Places in Maryland
Buildings and structures in Bel Air, Harford County, Maryland
Infrastructure completed in 1915
National Register of Historic Places in Harford County, Maryland